The first rector of Istanbul Technical University was Osman Tevfik Taylan. The incumbent president is Mehmet Karaca.

Presidents

References 

 Rectors, Istanbul Technical University archives

Istanbul Technical University